Antti Rautiola (born 8 February 1988) is a Finnish professional ice hockey goaltender who plays for Pelicans of the SM-liiga. He is currently on loan at Peliitat. He also used to play for Kärpät.

References

External links

1988 births
Oulun Kärpät players
Living people
Lahti Pelicans players
Finnish ice hockey goaltenders
People from Äänekoski
Sportspeople from Central Finland